The Hawthorn Greyhound Track was a former greyhound racing track in Pontypridd, Rhondda Cynon Taf, Wales.

The stadium was situated on Fairfield Lane off Cardiff Road and on the south side of the Rhyd-y-Felin railway branch (now the A470). Racing began in March 1932 and ended in 1970s with the site now being a football ground used by Rhydyfelin AFC and is called the old dog track.

References

Defunct greyhound racing venues in the United Kingdom
Greyhound racing in Wales
Greyhound racing task force articles